Philip Pilkington is an Irish economist working in investment finance. He became well-known for his critiques of neoclassical economics on his blog Fixing the Economists. Since then he has written a book entitled The Reformation in Economics outlining these critiques, developed an empirical methodology to assess general equilibrium theory and created a new means to estimate both potential output and inflationary pressure in the labor market.

Life
Pilkington was born in Dublin. He attended C.B.C. Monkstown. Pilkington received his Masters in Economics from Kingston University. His thesis focused on a stock-flow approach to asset price modelling and was subsequently published by the Levy Economics Institute.

Works
In his article "The Miracle of General Equilibrium"  Pilkington argues that all of contemporary macroeconomics is dominated by general equilibrium theory. He argues that both the New Keynesian and New Classical schools take as their starting point the assumption that general equilibrium can and eventually will be reached. Pilkington argues that they only disagree on how easy this is to achieve. Pilkington then goes on to argue that this case has never been argued empirically. He points out that the theory emerges with the French economist Léon Walras in 1899 but that Walras never laid out clear empirical criteria for his theory. Pilkington proceeds to lay out a test case based on the 'hats-in-ring' problem in probability theory.

In his paper How Far Can We Push This Thing? Pilkington develops a novel framework for estimating and understanding potential output. Pilkington argues that contemporary approaches to potential output either involve crude trend estimates that simply assume that economies usually operate at full capacity or they utilize the flawed NAIRU framework that has been disproved in practice in the past. He advocates a more intuitive and statistically-grounded approach to estimating potential output. Pilkington points out that statistics on capacity utilization are readily available for most countries. He argues that "the true constraint on economic growth at any moment in time is the utilisation rate of plant and machine" and so we should simply estimate the sensitivity of GDP to capacity utilization and in doing so derive an estimate of potential output.

References

Year of birth missing (living people)
Living people
21st-century Irish economists